The following is a list of notable deaths in May 2001.

Entries for each day are listed alphabetically by surname. A typical entry lists information in the following sequence:
 Name, age, country of citizenship at birth, subsequent country of citizenship (if applicable), reason for notability, cause of death (if known), and reference.

May 2001

1
Happy Hairston, 58, American professional basketball player (Cincinnati Royals, Detroit Pistons, Los Angeles Lakers).
Ernie Pomfret, 60, British middle-distance runner.
Richardson Pratt Jr, 78, American businessman, pancreatic cancer.
Ernie Wheelwright, 61, American football player.
Jason Miller, 62, American actor (The Exorcist, Rudy) and playwright (That Championship Season), Tony winner (1973), heart attack.

2
Dick Jamieson, 63, American minor league baseball player, professional football player (Baltimore Colts, New York Titans) and football coach (Indiana State University).
Howard Kahane, 73, American professor of philosophy.
Gina Mastrogiacomo, 39, American actress, myocarditis.
Ted Rogers, 65, British comedian, complications after open-heart surgery.
Theodore Roosevelt III, 86, American banker and government official.
Henry Zolinsky, 97, American poet.

3
Byrd Brown, 71, American civil rights leader, activist and lawyer.
Philip George Houthem Gell, 86, British immunologist.
Billy Higgins, 64, American jazz drummer.
Karel Kalaš, 90, Czech operatic bass and actor.
Princess Rosemary of Salm-Salm, 97, German noblewoman.
Hank Schmulbach, 76, American baseball player.

4
Anne Anastasi, 92, American psychologist.
Bonnie Lee Bakley, 44, American socialite, shot.
Gene Grabosky, 64, American professional football player (Syracuse University, Buffalo Bills).
Rita Lawrence, 90, British pianist and singer.
Stan Newsham, 69, English  footballer.
Arne Sucksdorff, 84, Swedish film director, pneumonia.

5
Charles Black, 85, American constitutional scholar.
Boozoo Chavis, 70, American accordion player, singer, songwriter and bandleader (Zydeco).
Morris Graves, 90, American expressionist painter.
Jules Halfant, 91, American painter and printmaker.
Roger P. Hill, British Royal Navy officer during World War II.
Cliff Hillegass, 83, American creator of CliffsNotes, stroke.
Bill Homeier, 82, American racecar driver (three Indianapolis 500s).
David Jamieson, 80, British Army officer, recipient of the Victoria Cross.
Agnes Nanogak, 75, Canadian Inuk artist.
Aleksandr Petrov, 61, Soviet/Russian basketball player.
Wang Yinglai, 93, Chinese biochemist.

6
Weldon B. Gibson, 84, American economist and an executive at SRI International.
Mike Hazlewood, 59, English singer, composer and songwriter, heart attack.
Laïty Kama, 62, Senegalese lawyer and president of the ICTR.
Karl Wilhelm Krause, 90, German Waffen-SS officer.
Cecil Price, 63, American deputy sheriff and Ku Klux Klan member, fall from a piece of equipment.

7
Malati Bedekar, 96, Indian writer.
Prem Dhawan, 77, Indian lyricist, music composer, and actor of Bollywood, cardiac arrest.
Edwin Finckel, 83, American jazz pianist, composer (George White's Scandals) and music educator.
Joseph Greenberg, 85, American linguist, known for his work on linguistic typology and the genetic classification of languages.
Dick Kimble, 85, American baseball player.
Margaretha Krook, 75, Swedish actress.
Jesús Rosas Marcano, 71, Venezuelan journalist, poet and composer of folk songs.
Boris Ryzhy, 26, Russian poet and geologist, suicide.
Simon Slåttvik, 83, Norwegian Olympic skier (gold medal winner of the Nordic combined at the 1952 Winter Olympics).
Al Tucker, 58, American basketball player.
Arthur Christopher Watson, 74, British diplomat.

8
Larry Hornung, 55, Canadian ice hockey player.
Hyman Kreitman, 86, British businessman, philanthropist and art collector.
John McMahon, 83, Australian-English cricket player.
Wilhelm Meentzen, 86, German naval officer.
Piero Natoli, 53, Italian actor and film director.
Clay King Smith, 30, American convicted murderer, execution by lethal injection.

9
Jay Bailey, American chemical engineer.
Marie Cardinal, 72, French novelist.
Saul Elkins, 93, American film producer, writer and director.
Andrés Framini, 86, Argentine labor leader and politician.
Nikos Sampson, 65, Cypriot politician, de facto President of Cyprus (1974).
Leslie Sands, 79, British actor.
William T. Stearn, 90, British botanist.
Smokey Yunick, 77, American mechanic and car designer, leukemia.

10
Dorothy Burr Thompson, 100, American classical archaeologist and art historian.
Turi Ferro, 80, Italian actor (Liolà, The Seduction of Mimi, Malizia).
John H. Maloney, 83, Canadian politician and physician.
James E. Myers, 81, American songwriter ("Rock Around the Clock"), actor and director.
Sudhakarrao Naik, 66, Indian politician.
M. Krishnan Nair, 74, Indian film director.
Frank Newby, 75, English structural engineer.
Arthur Tange, 86, Australian public servant.
Alison Waley, 100, New Zealand poet, journalist artist and writer.
Deborah Walley, 57, American actress (Gidget Goes Hawaiian, Beach Blanket Bingo, Spinout) and voice-over artist, esophageal cancer.

11
Douglas Adams, 49, British author, works included The Hitchhiker's Guide to the Galaxy, the two Dirk Gently novels and serials in the series Doctor Who, heart attack.
Jesús Aguirre, 66, Spanish intellectual, Jesuit priest, and aristocrat, pulmonary embolism.
Michael J. Bird, 72, British writer.
Guy Carlton, 47, American Olympic weightlifter (bronze medal winner in heavyweight weightlifting at the 1984 Summer Olympics).
Shahid Kabir, 69, Indian poet and writer.
Henry Katzman, 89, American musician, composer and painter.
Emmett Watson, 82, American newspaper columnist.

12
Ollie Cline, 75, American gridiron football player.
Perry Como, 88, American singer, actor and television personality.
Didi, 72, Brazilian footballer, pneumonia.
Juanita Martínez, 76, Argentine vedette.
Simon Raven, 73, British writer.
Eleanor Sayre, 85, American curator and art historian.
Norman C. Skogstad, 80, United States Army Air Forces flying ace during World War II.
Alexei Tupolev, 75, Soviet aircraft designer.
Corissa Yasen, 27, professional basketball player, suicide.

13
Eddra Gale, 79, American actress (8½, What's New Pussycat?, The Graduate, I Love You, Alice B. Toklas, Somewhere in Time).
Salvador Garmendia, 72, Venezuelan author,.
Peter Garthwaite, 91, English forester.
Kinfe Gebremedhin, Ethiopian Chief of Security and Immigration, murdered.
Paweł Hertz, 82, Polish writer, poet, and publisher.
Jason Miller, 62, American playwright and actor, heart attack.
R. K. Narayan, 94, Indian writer.
Ray Straw, 67, English footballer.
Ralph Tabakin, 79, American actor.

14
Mauro Bolognini, 78, Italian film and stage director.
Eric Bradbury, 80, British comic artist.
Alex Glasgow, 65, English singer-songwriter (On Your Way, Riley!, When the Boat Comes In).
Peter Griffith, 67, American child actor.
Gil Langley, 81, Australian Test cricketer and politician.
Loften Mitchell, 82, American playwright and theatre historian.
Armando Nannuzzi, 75, Italian cinematographer and camera operator.
Ettore Puricelli, 84, Uruguayan-Italian football player and manager.
Mohammed Abdullah Saleh, 71-72, Yemeni major general.
Frank Savickas, 66, American politician.

15
Jean-Philippe Lauer, 99, French architect and Egyptologist.
Juracy Magalhães, 95, Brazilian military officer and politician.
Ralph Miller, 82, American college basketball coach.
Bobby Murdoch, 56, Scottish professional footballer, stroke.
William Oates, 71, English first-class cricketer.
Georgy Shakhnazarov, 76, Soviet-Armenian politician and political scientist.

16
Charles Coe, 77, American amateur golfer.
Loren C. Dunn, 70, American Mormon general authority.
Prince Ital Joe, 38, Dominican-American reggae  artist, car accident.
Brian Pendleton, 57, British guitarist (The Pretty Things), lung cancer.
Reg Kesler, 81, Canadian rodeo rider.

17
Ike Brown, 59, American baseball player.
Alexander Cave, 100, British anatomist.
Ikuma Dan, 77, Japanese composer.
Enid Hattersley, 96, English Labour Party politician and Lord Mayor of Sheffield.
Robert Knapp, 77, American actor (Days of Our Lives, Dragnet, Gunsmoke, The F.B.I.).
Jacques-Louis Lions, 73, French mathematician.
Murray Murdoch, 96, Canadian ice hockey player and coach.
Frank G. Slaughter, 93, American novelist and physician.

18
Hazel Larsen Archer, 80, American photographer.
Rosa Beddington, 45, British biologist, cancer.
Stella Mary Newton, 100, British fashion designer and dress historian.
Maurice Noble, 90, American animation artist and designer.
William A. S. Ouderland, 83, Dutch-Australian commando officer.
Seán Mac Stíofáin, 73, English-Irish chief of staff of the Provisional IRA.
Alan Westerman, 88, Australian public servant.
Robert F. Woodward, 92, American diplomat.

19
Fred Derby, 61, Surinamese politician and trade unionist.
John Joseph Egan, 84, American Roman Catholic priest and social activist.
Joe Graydon, 82, American big band vocalist, television host, personal manager and concert producer.
Josef Haunzwickel, 86, Austrian Olympic athlete (men's pole vault at the 1936 Summer Olympics).
Patricia Hilliard, 85, British stage and film actress.
Joe Lovitto, 50, American baseball player.
Susannah McCorkle, 55, American jazz singer.
Barry Morris, 66, Australian politician.
Viktor Petermann, 84, German Luftwaffe flying ace during World War II.
Mike Sammes, 73, English musician and vocal session arranger.
John Warner, 78, British actor.

20
Carl Eric Almgren, 88, Swedish Army general.
Renato Carosone, 81, Italian musician.
Zhang Jun, 34, Chinese robber and serial killer, executed.
Bob Keely, 91, American baseball coach, scout and player.
Carlos Lara, 66, Argentine-Mexican footballer and coach.
Art Mergenthal, 80, American gridiron football player.
Bud Thomas, 90, American baseball player.

21
Erkin Bairam, 43, Cypriot-born New Zealand economist.
Philip W. Buchen, 85, American attorney and White House Counsel.
Mel Hoderlein, 77, American baseball player.
Bob Johnson, 65, Australian rules footballer.
Heinz Kamnitzer, 84, German writer and historian.
George Malcher, 86, Polish writer, historian, and political analyst.
Johnny Rainford, 70, English professional footballer.
Gabriele Rumi, 61, Italian Formula One team owner, cancer.
Tad Szulc, 74, Polish-American journalist.
Graham Webster, 87, British archaeologist.

22
Lorez Alexandria, 71, American jazz singer.
Katharine Bartlett, 93, American physical anthropologist.
Jenő Fock, 85, Hungarian communist politician, prime minister (1967-1975).
Ralph Hamner, 84, American baseball player.
Dmitry Loza, 79, Ukrainian Red Army officer.
Whitman Mayo, 70, American actor (Sanford and Son), heart attack.
Jack Watling, 78, British actor (The Plane Makers, The Power Game, Pathfinders).

23
Ibrahim Abu-Lughod, 72, Palestinian-born American academic.
Jean Champion, 84, French film actor.
Lita Chevret, 92, American actress.
Lee Chiaw Meng, 64, Singaporean politician, cancer.
Tommy Eyre, 51, British keyboardist.
Walter Eytan, 90, Israeli diplomat.
Bob Gaona, 70, American professional football player (Pittsburgh Steelers, Philadelphia Eagles).
Douglas Gardiner, 96, Australian architect.
Chuck Gelatka, 87, American professional football player (Mississippi State, New York Giants).
Boris Gyuderov, 74, Bulgarian Olympic volleyball player (1964).
Arno Mohr, 90, German painter and graphic artist.
Alessandro Natta, 83, Italian communist politician.
Ridvan Qazimi, 37, Kosovar Albanian insurgent nationalist, K.I.A.
P. Ramachandran, 79, Indian politician, Governor of Kerala.
Harry Townes, 86, American actor (Finian's Rainbow, Gunsmoke, The Twilight Zone, Star Trek) and an Episcopalian priest.
Arseny Vorozheykin, 88, Soviet/Russian fighter ace during World War II.

24
Lucy Boscana, 85, Puerto Rico actress.
Elvin Hutchison, 88, American football player and official.
Paul Kor, 74, Israeli painter and children's writer.
Margarita Liberaki, 82, Greek writer and dramatist.
Patricia Robertson, 38, American physician and a NASA astronaut, plane crash.
Javier Urruticoechea, 49, Spanish footballer, car crash.

25
Edmund Kara, 75, American  fashion illustrator, designer, and sculptor.
Alberto Korda, 72, Cuban photographer.
Arturo Maly, 61, Argentine actor.
Malcom McLean, 87, American businessman and shipper.
Fadil Nimani, 34, Kosovar Albanian insurgent nationalist, K.I.A.
Brian Pendleton, 57, British guitarist, and member of Pretty Things.
Sir Harold Ridley, 94, British ophthalmologist.
Paladine Roye, 54, Native American painter.

26
Vittorio Brambilla, 63, Italian Formula One race car driver.
Anne Haney, 67, American actress (Mrs. Doubtfire, The American President, Liar Liar), heart failure.
Moven Mahachi, 53, Zimbabwean Minister of Defence of the Republic of Zimbabwe.
Hal Moe, 91, American gridiron football player and coach.

27
Raymond Andrew, 79, British physicist.
Ramon Bieri, 71, American actor (Sarge, Room 222, Daniel Boone, Gunsmoke).
Helen Oakley Dance, 88, Canadian-American jazz journalist, record producer, and music historian.
Victor Kiam, 74, American entrepreneur, TV spokesman (Remington Products) and owner of the New England Patriots football team (1988–1991).
Ralph Nichols, 90, English badminton player.
Agda Rössel, 90, Swedish politician.
Robert H. Scanlan, American civil and aeronautical engineer.
Jack Scowen, 65, Canadian politician.
Nikolai Yeremenko Jr., 52, Soviet/Russian actor and film director.

28
Tony Ashton, 55, English rock pianist, music producer and artist.
Francis Bebey, 71, Cameroonian writer and composer.
Richard Borgnis, 90, English cricketer and Royal Navy officer.
Italo Cappabianca, 64, American politician.
Joe Moakley, 74, American politician, member of the United States House of Representatives from Massachusetts's 9th congressional district (1973 – 2001).
Vulimiri Ramalingaswami, 79, Indian medical scientist.
Rockets Redglare, 52, American character actor and comedian (After Hours, Desperately Seeking Susan).
Elizabeth S. Russell, 88, American geneticist.
Francisco Varela, 54, Chilean biologist, philosopher and neuroscientist.

29
John Fleming, 81, British art historian.
Eddie Forrest, 79, American professional football player (San Francisco 49ers).
Akira Fujita, 93, Japanese Olympic water polo player (men's water polo at the 1932 Summer Olympics).
Peter MacLeod, 70, Canadian politician and farmer.
Charley Pell, 60, American college football player and coach, lung cancer.
Hédi Temessy, 76, Hungarian actress.

30
Werner Fricker, 65, German-American soccer player and official.
Terry Gathercole, 65, Australian Olympic swimmer (silver medal winner of the men's 4 x 100 metre medley relay at the 1960 Summer Olympics).
Inderjit Singh Gill, 79, Indian Army officer.
Adrian Hastings, 71, British Roman Catholic priest and historian.
Nikolai Korndorf, 54, Russian-Canadian composer and conductor.
John Pickering, 56, English footballer.
Jaime Benítez Rexach, 92, Puerto Rican author, academic and politician.
Renée Schuurman, 61, South African tennis player.
Rajko Tomović, 81, Serbian and Yugoslav scientist.
Denis Whitaker, 86, Canadian athlete, soldier, and author.

31
Arlene Francis, 93, American actress, radio and television talk show host, and game show panelist (What's My Line?), alzheimer's disease and cancer.
Jagannath Kaushal, 86, Indian politician.
Li Kwoh-ting, 91, Taiwanese economist and politician.
Tex McKenzie, 70, American professional wrestler, abdominal aortic aneurysm.
Nancy Stevenson, 72, American politician.
Rosemary Verey, 82, English garden designer.

References 

2001-05
 05